Lerin Duarte (born 11 August 1990) is a Dutch professional footballer who plays as a midfielder.

Having come through the youth department of Sparta Rotterdam, he started his senior career at the club, before transferring to Heracles Almelo. He spent two seasons there, before moving to Eredivisie champions Ajax in 2013. Following two loans to SC Heerenveen and NAC Breda, he returned to Heracles Almelo in summer 2016.

Club career

Sparta and Heracles 
Born in Rotterdam, Duarte started in the youth department of Sparta Rotterdam. He continued through the youth academy and made his first senior appearance for the club in the Eredivisie on 1 August 2009, in a 0–2 home defeat to FC Twente. He continued to play in the first team in the 2009–2010 season and finished with 9 appearances. At the end of the season Sparta was relegated to the Eerste Divisie. After playing the following 2010–11 season with the club he joined Heracles Almelo, thereby returning to the Eredivisie.

Duarte agreed a three-year contract, with the option of an extra year, with Eredivisie club Heracles Almelo after passing a medical on 15 June 2011. He made his league debut for the club on 6 August 2011 against RKC Waalwijk coming on as a substitute in the 60th minute.

Ajax
On 31 August 2013, at the end of the Eredivisie match between Heracles Almelo and ADO Den Haag, it was announced by Jan Smit that Ajax and Heracles Almelo had agreed to terms for the direct transfer of Duarte to the capital city. Duarte joined the Amsterdammers for the sum of €2.5 million from Almelo, signing a four-year contract binding him to his new club until 2017. He was given the number 8 shirt previously worn by Christian Eriksen upon his arrival. Duarte made his debut for Ajax on 14 September 2013 in a 2–1 at home against PEC Zwolle. He made his continental debut at Camp Nou in a 4–0 loss against FC Barcelona, playing the full 90 minutes of the 2013–14 UEFA Champions League Group stage match. On 28 September Duarte scored his first goal for Ajax, in a 6–0 victory at home against Go Ahead Eagles, scoring the fifth goal in the 64th minute of the game.

Heerenveen, NAC and Heracles 
After the move of Daley Sinkgraven to Ajax, Duarte was sent on loan to SC Heerenveen for the rest of the 2014–2015 season In January 2015.

Following his release by Ajax, free agent Duarte returned to former club Heracles Almelo, agreeing a three-year contract with the club.

Aris Thessaloniki and ASWH 
On 2 June 2019, Duarte agreed to join Aris on a three-year contract. On 1 July 2020 in an away match against Panathinaikos, he suffered a serious knee injury.

At the end of January 2023, Duarte signed with the Derde Divisie-side ASWH from Hendrik-Ido-Ambacht. After a lot of training and having sat just one game on the ASWH bench during an official game, he left ASWH.

International career
Duarte was born in the Netherlands and has Cape Verdean origin, therefore, he is eligible by the Netherlands and Cape Verde. He has represented the Netherlands at Under-21 level having been called up on 4 September 2011 for the game against Luxembourg in the UEFA Under 21 Championship. Duarte went on to start on the bench before being substituted on in the 76th minute to make his international debut, the game ended in a 4–0 win for the Netherlands.

In May 2013, Duarte was called up for the Dutch senior team for two friendlies, against China and Indonesia, however he stayed on the bench for both matches as an unused substitute.

Career statistics

Honours

Club
Ajax
 Eredivisie: 2013–14
 Eusébio Cup: 2014

References

External links

 
 Voetbal International profile 
 Netherlands stats at OnsOranje

1990 births
Living people
Dutch sportspeople of Cape Verdean descent
Dutch footballers
Footballers from Rotterdam
Association football midfielders
Sparta Rotterdam players
Heracles Almelo players
AFC Ajax players
Jong Ajax players
SC Heerenveen players
NAC Breda players
Aris Thessaloniki F.C. players
Eredivisie players
Eerste Divisie players
Super League Greece players
Netherlands under-21 international footballers
Dutch expatriate footballers
Expatriate footballers in Greece